Buttermilk Falls is  located on Oak Creek northeast of Worcester, New York and just south of Gothicville, New York.

References

Waterfalls of New York (state)
Landforms of Otsego County, New York
Tourist attractions in Otsego County, New York